Marathesium or Marathesion was a town of ancient Ionia on the coast south of Ephesus, and not far from the frontiers of Caria, whence Stephanus of Byzantium calls it a town of Caria. It is also mentioned in the Periplus of Pseudo-Scylax and by Pliny the Elder. 
The town belonged to the Samians; but at some time they made an exchange, and, giving it to the Ephesians, receiving  in return the Neapolis. 
It was a member of the Delian League since it appears in tribute records of Athens between the years 443/2 and 415/4 BCE.

Its site is located near Ambar Tepe, Aydın Province, Turkey.

References

Populated places in ancient Ionia
Former populated places in Turkey
Members of the Delian League
Samian colonies
History of Aydın Province